The Snakestretchers were a band assembled by Danny Gatton to play a PBS documentary on WNET in New York City, hosted by Bill Graham. The original band was Roy Buchanan (lead guitar), Dick Heintze (keyboards), Michael "Pokey" Walls (drums & vocals), Chuck Tilley (vocals & rhythm guitar) and Danny Gatton on bass. Gatton and Walls left the group before the show was taped and teamed up at Gus N' Johns Restaurant, also in "suburban MD". (Peter Van Allen '72-74 Bass)

References

The source of this article is Michael "Pokey" Walls, a musician who played the Washington DC club, concert and recording scene from 1965 to 1988, working and recording with Roy Buchanan, Danny Gatton and others. He also recorded with the British Walkers and The Chartbusters and was the main recording drummer for Paramount Artists in Washington DC. He still performs in the Tampa Bay area. The account is first hand knowledge.

American rock music groups